Juan Pablo Duarte y Díez (January 26, 1813 – July 15, 1876) was a Dominican military leader, writer, activist, and nationalist politician who was the foremost of the founding fathers of the Dominican Republic and bears the title of Father of the Nation. As one of the most celebrated figures in Dominican history, Duarte is considered a national hero and revolutionary visionary in the modern Dominican Republic, who along with military general Ramón Matías Mella and Francisco del Rosario Sánchez, organized and promoted La Trinitaria, a secret society that eventually led to the Dominican revolt and independence from Haitian rule in 1844 and the start of the Dominican War of Independence.

Duarte became an officer in the National Guard and a year later in 1843 he participated in the "Reformist Revolution" against the dictatorship of Jean-Pierre Boyer, who threatened to invade the western part of the island with the intention of unifying it. After the defeat of the Haitian President and the proclamation of the Dominican Republic in 1844, the Board formed to designate the first ruler of the nation and elected Duarte by a strong majority vote to preside over the nation but he declined the proposal, while Tomás Bobadilla took office instead.

Duarte helped inspire and finance the Dominican War of Independence, paying a heavy toll which would eventually ruin him financially. Duarte also disagreed strongly with royalist and pro-annexation sectors in the nation, especially with the wealthy caudillo and military strongman Pedro Santana, who sought to rejoin the Spanish Empire. From these struggles, Santana emerged victorious while Duarte suffered in exile, despite coming back a few times, Duarte lived most of his remaining years in Venezuela until his death in 1876.

Early years

Duarte was born on 26 January 1813 in Santo Domingo, Captaincy General of Santo Domingo during the period commonly called España Boba. In his memoirs, La Trinitaria member  described Duarte as a man with a rosy complexion, sharp features, blue eyes, and a golden hair that contrasted with his thick, dark moustache.

Duarte was born into a middle-class family that was dedicated to maritime trade and hardware in the port area of Santo Domingo. His father was Juan José Duarte Rodríguez, a Peninsular from Vejer de la Frontera, Kingdom of Seville, Spain, and his mother was Manuela Díez Jiménez from El Seibo, Captaincy General of Santo Domingo; three of Duarte's grandparents were Europeans. Duarte had 9 siblings: his eldest brother,  (1802–1865), a tall, long-haired brunette man, was a store owner, woodcutter and cattle rancher who was born in Mayagüez, Puerto Rico; one of Duarte's sisters was Rosa Protomártir Duarte (1820–1888), a performer who collaborated with him within the Independence movement. In 1801 the Duarte family migrated from Santo Domingo to Mayagüez, Puerto Rico. They were evading the unrest caused by the Haitian Revolution in the island. Many Dominican families left the island during this period. Toussaint Louverture, governor of Saint-Domingue (now Haiti), a former colony of France located on the western third of Hispaniola, arrived to the capital of Santo Domingo, located on the island's eastern two-thirds, the previous year and proclaimed the end of slavery (although the changes were not permanent). At the time, France and Saint-Domingue (the western third of the island), were going through exhaustive social movements, namely, the French Revolution and the Haitian Revolution. In occupying the Spanish side of the island L'Ouverture was using as a pretext the previous agreements between the governments of France and Spain in the Peace of Basel signed in 1795, which had given the Spanish area to France. Louverture wanted to convert the old Spanish institutions to French and re-establish the plantation economy on both sides of the island.

Upon arrival in Santo Domingo Norte, L'Ouverture immediately sought to abolish slavery in Dominican territory, even though slavery was abolished in 1821 per Spanish Haiti constitution. Puerto Rico was still a Spanish colony, and Mayagüez, being so close to Hispaniola, just across the Mona Passage, had become a refuge for migrants from Santo Domingo like the Duartes and other native born on the Spanish side who did not accept Haitian dictatorship. Most scholars assume that the Duartes' first son, Vicente Celestino, was born here at this time on the eastern side of the Mona Passage. The family returned to Santo Domingo in 1809, however, after the Spanish reconquest of Santo Domingo, led by governor- general Juan Sánchez Ramírez, that decisively crushed French rule in Santo Domingo, but returned to Spanish rule. 

In 1819, Duarte enrolled in Manuel Aybar's school where he learned reading, writing, grammar and arithmetic. He was a disciple of Dr. Juan Vicente Moscoso from whom he obtained his higher education in Latin, philosophy and law, due to the closure of the university by the Haitian authorities. After the exile of Dr. Moscoso to Cuba, his role was continued by the priest Gaspar Hernández.

Ephemeral Independence

In December 1821, when Duarte was eight years old, members of a Creole elite of Santo Domingo's capital proclaimed its independence from Spanish rule, calling themselves Haití Español. Historians today call this elite's brief courtship with sovereignty the Ephemeral Independence. The most prominent leader of the coup against Spanish colonial government was one of its former supporters, José Núñez de Cáceres. These individuals were tired of being ignored by the Crown, and some were also concerned with the new liberal turn in Madrid.

Their deed was not an isolated event. The 1820s was a time of profound political changes throughout the entire Spanish Atlantic World, which affected directly the lives of middle-class like the Duartes. It began with the conflictive period between Spanish royalists and liberals in the Iberian Peninsula, which is known today as the Trienio Liberal. American patriots in arms, like Simón Bolívar in South America, immediately reaped the fruits of Spain's destabilization, and began pushing back colonial troops. Even conservative elites in New Spain (like Agustín de Iturbide in Mexico), who had no intention of being ruled by Spanish anticlericals, moved to break ties with the crown in Spain.

Many others in Santo Domingo wanted independence from Spain for reasons much closer to home. Inspired by the revolution and independence on the island, Dominicans mounted a number of different movements and conspiracies in the period from 1809 to 1821 against slavery and colonialism.  Several towns asked for Haiti to help with Dominican independence weeks before the experiment of Haití Español even began.

The Cáceres provisional government requested support from Simón Bolivar's new government, but their petition was ignored given the internal conflicts of the Gran Colombia.

Annexation by Haiti

Meanwhile, a plan for unification with Haiti grew stronger. Haitian politicians wanted to keep the island out of the hands of European imperial powers and thus a way to safeguard the Haitian Revolution . Haiti's President Jean-Pierre Boyer sent an army that took over the eastern portion of Hispaniola. Struggles between Boyer and the old colonial helped produce a migration of planters and elite. It also led to the closing of the university. Following the bourgeoisie custom of sending promising sons abroad for education, the Duartes sent Juan Pablo to the United States and Europe in 1828 . While on board the ship, the captain would insinuate to Duarte that his people were cowards and repeatedly referred to him as "Haitian," to which Duarte rejected being referred to as such. This event was said to have had a revolutionary spark in the still teenaged Duarte.

Era of Enlightenment

In Europe, convulsed in the era of romanticism, liberalism, nationalism and utopian socialism, it was engulfed with revolutionary atmospheres at the time. Having thrown himself into these scenes of European radicalism, Duarte himself had the pleasure of witnessing the new regimes of liberty and rights that had arisen after the French Revolution; He was intrigued by the new changes produced in Germany and France, but none was caught his interest more that that of Spain, of which reforms introduced by Cortes of Cádiz. He would remain in Barcelona for the rest of his travels, where it is believed that he studied law.  

It was then that his political ideology began to take shape, in which nationalism and liberalism merged on a romantic background: Duarte understood that the Dominican people had their own identity and had the absolute right to bring about political independence. Since the beginning of the 16th century, the Dominicans, despite the economic disadvantages, have a history of rebelling and triumphing battles against Dutch, British, French, and Spanish forces, (the latter two of which in recent decades, were expelled from Santo Domingo by Dominican rebels in 1809 and 1821 respectively). This time, Duarte firmly believed that the Dominicans would now have to rise up arms against the fierce might of the Haitians. Upon the success of this goal, the newly independent nation would be organized on the basis of the institutionalism of representative democracy. Having formalized these ideals, the enlightened Duarte returned to his homeland In 1833.  

With his return, Duarte decided that the time has come to put his revolutionary ideals to the test. Having spent his time visioning a state free from any foreign rule, he would be inspired to formulate a movement that would bring about the end of Haitian rule and begin a new era for the Dominicans. During this time, the Dominican people were living in a time of absolute oppression and tyranny under that rule of the Haitians. Mandatory use of the French Language, suppression of Dominican cultures, forceful redistribution of wealth, and the strict policies enacted by Boyer's Code Rural act led Duarte to begin formulating a plan to for independence.

Another reason of Duarte's decision, similar to that of José Núñez de Cáceres, may perhaps stem out of an admiration of the Haitian Revolution. Duarte was quoted, for his reasoning of independence:

Struggle for independence

Founding of La Trinitaria

On July 16, 1838, Duarte and others established a secret patriotic society called La Trinitaria, which helped undermine Haitian occupation. Some of its first members included Juan Isidro Pérez, Pedro Alejandro Pina, Jacinto de la Concha, Félix María Ruiz, José María Serra, Benito González, Felipe Alfau, and Juan Nepomuceno Ravelo.

Duarte told his men firmly:

 
 
But before he could continue, the men suddenly erupted, declaring the fight for independence as a necessity and that there are no compromises. Duarte, satisfied with the men's response, took this as proof their commitment to the cause. After this, he took out a document from his pocket, to which Duarte had his men sign with blood. But before the men recited an oath, pledging allegiance to the cause:

After reciting the oath, each of the men proceeded to sign the document, in addition to placing a cross before each other's name. Duarte then said to his men:

Later, Duarte and others founded a society called La Filantrópica, which had a more public presence, seeking to spread veiled ideas of liberation through theatrical stages. By this time, support for the movement and grown, and their influence would continue to stretch throughout ever society. He even had the opportunity to enlist more members that would help further the cause, of which his most influential and key collaborators were none other than 26-year old Matías Ramón Mella, a skilled military leader whom became aware of Duarte's influence through his marriage back in 1836, and 25-year old Francisco del Rosario Sánchez, a well polished lawyer whom he met during philosophy courses.

Brief alliance with the Haitians
In 1842, Duarte became a high-ranking officer in the Haitian National Guard. During this time however, the regime of Boyer had gone from being a liberal and progressive government to becoming an absolutist one in the midst of serious economic problems and strong internal resistance in the western part of the island. This was due to the fact that the island had become increasingly dissatisfied with the labor policies enacted from Boyer's Code Rural act, which installed a policy of forced labor to both Dominicans and Haitians alike. Duarte, having learned of the growing disdain for Boyer's administration, saw an advantage to help further his cause.

Subsequently, Duarte learned of a liberal movement that was formulating in the western part of the island, with the intention to remove Boyer from power. As such, he sent Juan Nepomuceno Ravelo to make agreements to align with the movement. When this failed, he commissioned Mella to Les Ceyes to make the negotiations with that Haitians; this was a success. Duarte and the Trinitarios now had the edge for their cause of independence.

Birth of a new nation

First exile and declaration of independence

In 1843, in full preparation to organize the separation movement, Duarte had to leave Haiti clandestinely for Curaçao due to his insurgent behavior, where he was surprised by the news of his father's death on November 25 of that year. Then, Duarte tells his mother to sell the family business to finance the separatist revolution, to which his mother is opposed at first.

In his absence, Sánchez had to take the reins of the separatist movement and make an alliance with the conservative sector headed by Tomás Bobadilla, Briones and Buenaventura Báez , resulting in the Manifesto of January 16, 1844. All of this, along with the help of many who wanted to get rid of the Haitians who ruled over the Dominicans, triumphed, as the Dominicans successfully expelled the Haitians out of the country, leading to the proclamation of independence on February 27, 1844.

Drafted constitution of 1844

Juan Pablo Duarte returned to Santo Domingo on March 15, 1844, days after the country's separation was declared, loaded with the weapons he had bought in Curaçao with his own family's money and being tremendously received as Father of the Nation . Immediately, he was appointed general of the army and a member of the Central Board that governed the nascent republic. This board also had the purpose of designating the first ruler of the nation. Although Duarte was supported by many as a candidate for the presidency and Mella even declared him president, Duarte declined arguing that he would only accept the position if the majority election of the Dominicans voted in his flavored. Instead, Tomas Bobadilla took office. 
Duarte was supported by many as a candidate for the presidency of the new-born Republic. Mella wanted Duarte to simply declare himself president. Duarte never giving up on the principles of democracy and fairness by which he lived, would only accept if voted in by a majority of the Dominican people.  Duarte had a definite concept of the Dominican nation and its members. His conception of a republic was that of a republican, anticolonial, liberal and progressive patriot. At that time he drafted a draft constitution that clearly states that the Dominican flag can shelter all races, without excluding or giving predominance to any.

Differences with Santana and second exile
On May 26, 1844, Tomás Bobadilla, a jurist, the first governor of the new Junta, and a powerful representative of the interests of the bourgeois majority that supported the separation, proposed turning the newly created republic into a protectorate of France. The Frenchified sector led by Bobadilla had seized power and had a majority in the recently created Central Government Board. On June 9, Duarte led, together with Sánchez and Mella, a coup d'état that removed Bobadilla and replaced the French-speaking members of the Central Board with other liberals. This new Junta, now headed by Sánchez , sent Duarte and Mella the northern region to get support. In July, the army of the north proclaimed Duarte as president. Despite the fact that Duarte did not accept, Pedro Santana protested and, relying on the southern army, entered Santo Domingo and dissolved the Junta presided over by Sánchez, creating another. In August, Pedro Santana ordered the arrest of Duarte, who refused to rejoin Spain. However, he allowed himself to be captured to avoid a civil war that could be taken advantage of by the Haitians and on September 10,  Santana declared Duarte, Sánchez, Mella and other separatist liberals as "traitors to the Fatherland" by sending them into exile in Hamburg. After a brief stay in Hamburg, on November 30 Duarte moved to the Caribbean island of Saint Thomas. From there, he moved to La Guaira, Venezuela, where his entire family, now plunged into misery, had also been exiled by Santana.

Duarte's family in Venezuela did not do too badly, they lived and worked in an affluent area.  Duarte's cousin Manuel Diez became vice president of the country and helped shelter his kinsman.  Duarte's family was known to produce candles, this was a major retail and wholesale product since light bulbs for lighting had not been invented yet. While not luxuriously rich an income was available for the Duarte's.  Juan Pablo being a man of action as well of a high level of curiosity went off to live in the Venezuela, there he had some contacts and he made off to meet with them.  The Venezuela of this period was wracked by a series of civil wars and internal dissensions.  Duarte even though he and his family were already by this time residents of the country, still felt ambivalent about openly participating in the country's political life, all this despite the fact that the aforementioned cousin Manuel Antonio Díez from the vice presidency, went on to become President of Venezuela in an Ad Tempore capacity.

Duarte travels in Venezuela involved studying the indigenous people's and learning from the black and mulatto communities as well as observing as much as he could of the Venezuela of his time.  Duarte was an extremely educated man, fluent in many languages, he was a former soldier and teacher.  These abilities helped him survive and thrive in those places he travelled.  It also marked him as an outsider, given the fact that he was of Caribbean descent, he probably sounded much different than most of the Spanish speakers around him.  However Santo Domingo and the Republic that he had helped father were also highly likely always close to his heart and his mind.  So he was very much a man divided, excited and deeply moved by the current surroundings, people's and events around him, however very much thinking about his beloved land and people whom he sacrificed so much for.  A man in a contemplative mood, wounded by the drastic expulsion such as he suffered, would have very little time for a long term wife, children or true stability.

Loss of Dominican independence

Prelude to annexation

Within the 17 years of the First Republic, the nation was ravaged with political and economic instability. Political power passed to the conservative group of hateros and former Frenchified boyerista officials, thanks to the control of the presidency of the Central Government Board by Bobadilla and of the Liberation Army by General Santana, who ruled dictatorially in various periods. As time progressed, the constant power struggles between Santana and Buenaventura Báez, a hatero and woodcutter from the southwest of the country, more cunning and no less annexationist than the former, set the stage for a period of political and economic chaos.

Between 1853 and 1857, Santana and Báez engaged in a series of political confrontations that eventually reached its breaking point with the outbreak of the Cibano Revolution during Báez's second term in office. All the while, both would continue to propose that the Dominican Republic be annexed to a foreign power, with Santana choosing Spain, and Báez subjecting the United States. With Báez's overthrow in 1858, Santana once again president. But by now, the nation was on the brink of collapse due to the heavy spending of the war, and the bankrupt treasury left behind from Báez administration. All of this, in addition to fears of a renewed Haitian invasion, led to Santana to seek out the proposals from Queen Isabella II of Spain.

Final years and death
 
Duarte, then living in Venezuela, was made the Dominican Consul and provided with a pension to honor him for his sacrifice. But even this after some time was not honored and he lost commission and pension. He, Juan Pablo Duarte, the poet, philosopher, writer, actor, soldier, general, dreamer and hero died nobly in Caracas at the age of 63. His remains were transferred to Dominican soil in 1884—ironically, by president and dictator Ulises Heureaux, and given a proper burial with full honors. He is entombed in a beautiful mausoleum, the Altar de la Patria, at the Count's Gate (Puerta del Conde), alongside his fellow companions Sanchez and Mella, who were also very important during the Dominican Republic's founding.

Personal life

Duarte's personal life to date is the subject of discussion. It is known that he was a poet who followed Romanticism . He also used to play the guitar, the piano and the flute; he also practiced fencing .

During his youth, Duarte had several love affairs. His first relationship was with María Antonia Bobadilla, which she ended years later for unknown reasons. Years later, Duarte fell in love with Prudencia "Nona" Lluberes, a Catalan descendant with whom he formalized a relationship that was interrupted due to his exile and his subsequent suffering from tuberculosis . The dates on which Duarte maintained these relationships are not known, given the imprecision about his private life and the last years of his life in exile. Some historians also certify that he had a son during his stay in Venezuela with a woman named Marcela Mercedes. [ 8 ]

Legacy and honors

 Duarte's birth is commemorated by Dominicans every January 26.
 Many places in the Dominican Republic bear his name, among them the country's (and the Caribbean's) highest point, Pico Duarte.
 Duarte is solely depicted on the one Dominican peso coin; he is also depicted on the 100 Dominican peso note alongside Sánchez and Mella. 
 A memorial to Duarte stands in Roger Williams Park in Providence, Rhode Island
Broad St. in Providence, Rhode Island co-named Juan Pablo Duarte Boulevard
 A bronze statue to Duarte was erected at the intersection of 6th Avenue and Canal Street in New York City in 1978.
 St. Nicholas Avenue in Manhattan is co-named Juan Pablo Duarte Boulevard from Amsterdam Avenue and West 162nd Street to the intersection of West 193rd Street and Fort George Hill.
 Puente Juan Pablo Duarte is a suspension bridge that is located in Santo Domingo; it was named after him.
A bust of Duarte at the Permanent Mission of the Dominican Republic to the Organization of American States was dedicated in 2010.

See also
France-Haiti relations
Dominican Republic-Spain relations
Haiti-United States relations
Dominican Republic-Haiti relations
History of the Dominican Republic
Republic of Spanish Haiti
Haitian occupation of Santo Domingo
Dominican War of Independence
Dominican Restoration War
Juan Sánchez Ramírez
José Núñez de Cáceres
Francisco del Rosario Sánchez
Matías Ramón Mella
La Trinitaria

Notes

References

External links

1813 births
1876 deaths
People from Santo Domingo
Caribbean people
Dominican Republic people of Spanish descent
19th-century Dominican Republic poets
Dominican Republic male poets
Caribbean writers
Caribbean philosophers
History of the Dominican Republic
Caribbean political people
Duarte Province
19th-century rebels
19th-century male writers
Dominican Republic emigrants to Venezuela
Flag designers
Dominican Republic revolutionaries
People of the Dominican War of Independence
Dominican Republic independence activists
Dominican Republic military leaders
Dominican Republic Roman Catholics
Hispanic and Latino
Latin American people
White Dominicans